Saarde is a settlement in Võru Parish, Võru County in southeastern Estonia.

References

Võru Parish
Villages in Võru County